Bremstein Lighthouse is a coastal lighthouse in Vega Municipality in Nordland county, Norway.

The lighthouse was established in 1925 and it was automated in 1980.

There is also a secondary light  up the lighthouse tower.  The top light emits three white flashes every 40 seconds and the second light emits a white, red, or green (depending on direction) that is occulting three times every 10 seconds.  This lighthouse is somewhat unique in that it has two 2nd order Fresnel lenses, one for each of the two lights.

See also

Lighthouses in Norway
List of lighthouses in Norway

References

External links
 Norsk Fyrhistorisk Forening 
 Picture of Bremstein Lighthouse

Lighthouses completed in 1925
Lighthouses in Nordland
Vega, Norway